Burke County is the name of three counties in the United States:

 Burke County, Georgia 
 Burke County, North Carolina 
 Burke County, North Dakota